Tom Grattan's War was a British television series which ran from 1968 to 1970. The show revolved around the life of Tom Grattan who was sent to live with relatives in Yorkshire during the Great War.

Plotlines and setting

Tom Grattan was a 15-year-old boy from London during World War One who is sent to live on a farm in Yorkshire for the duration of the war with relatives the Kirkby family. While living on the farm he has various adventures involving German spies, saboteurs, escaped P.O.W.'s, criminals and secret weapons.

The series was filmed entirely on location in rural Yorkshire including making use of various rundown and abandoned castles, quarries and factories although the show did also feature vintage stock footage from the war.

The story-lines ranged with some plots carrying over for multiple chapters while other episodes were stand alone.

Cast
Michael Howe as Tom Grattan
Sally Adcock as Julie Kirkby
Connie Merigold as Mrs Kirkby
George Malpas as Stan Hobbs
Richard Warner as the Host/Narrator

Artist Clive Hicks-Jenkins appeared as a guest star in one multiple episode story line. Some episodes were directed by Ronald Eyre and others by Stephen Frears.

Broadcast history

26 episodes were produced by Yorkshire Television with the show originally airing between 1968 and 1970 in Britain and was also carried in Canada on TV Ontario and in America on the American Broadcast Company network. It was released on Region 2 DVD in July 2009.

Other media

Stories from the series were also adapted in paperback book form.

References

External links
IMDB page on Tom Grattan's War
tv.com webpage
Fanbase site
Detailed article about the series with photos
Brief article from a former cast member with a behind the scenes photo

World War I television drama series
Television shows set in Yorkshire
1969 British television series debuts
1970 British television series endings